Therma was a town of ancient Lesbos.

The site of Therma is tentatively located near modern Agios Thumianos.

References

Populated places in the ancient Aegean islands
Former populated places in Greece
Ancient Lesbos